Ingobernable is a Mexican political web television series.

Ingobernable may also refer to:
 La Ingobernable, a series of self-managed social centres in Madrid, Spain
 Los Ingobernables, a Mexican professional wrestling stable
 Los Ingobernables de Japón, a Japanese professional wrestling stable